The Miaoli County Council (MCC) is the elected county council of Miaoli County, Republic of China. The council composes of 38 councillors most recently elected in the 2018 Republic of China local elections on 24 November 2018.

History
After the handover of Taiwan from Japan to the Republic of China (ROC) on 25 October 1945, the area of present-day Miaoli County became part of Hsinchu County. In 1950, local self-government was implemented and administrative division of the ROC was adjusted in which Miaoli County was established and subsequently the country government was established on 25 October 1950. On 7 January 1951, the first term of the county councilors were elected and inaugurated on 19 January the same year.

See also
 Miaoli County Government

References

External links

 

County councils of Taiwan
Miaoli County